Vladimir Cuk (born September 1, 1975) is a Croatian actor and former basketball player.

Cuk, notable for his tall stature at  nicknamed "The tallest actor in Hollywood" has appeared in several movies, television shows, commercials and video games in the 1990s and 2000s. Cuk was born on September 1, 1975, in Zagreb, Croatia. He made his way to acting after a 22-game college basketball career at James Madison University between 1991 and 1994 averaging 0.3 points per game.

Cuk got his first acting role as Lurch in the 1996 basketball film Celtic Pride starring Damon Wayans and Daniel Stern. Cuk then received more acting roles after that appearing in the 1997 movie The 6th Man starring Damon's brother Marlon Wayans. Cuk has also appeared on an episode of The Parkers in 2002.

Cuk has been featured in several commercials for companies such as Nissan, Coinstar and General Electric.

Filmography 
 Celtic Pride (1996) – Lurch
 The 6th Man (1997) – Zigi Hrbacek
 The Parkers (2002), 1 episode
 Cedric the Entertainer presents (2002), 1 episode
 James Bond 007: Everything or Nothing (2003)
 Forbidden Warrior (2005) – Tall Tall

References

External links 
  
 Official Website
 Collegiate basketball statistics at College Basketball Reference

1975 births
Living people
James Madison Dukes men's basketball players
Centers (basketball)
Croatian male actors
Croatian men's basketball players
Male actors from Zagreb
Croatian expatriate basketball people in the United States